Kaija Kokkola (born 10 September 1962), better known by her stage name Kaija Koo, is a Finnish singer.

Kokkola began her career when she was 17 years old, as a member of a band Steel City, later known as Kaija Koo Band, until it broke up and Kaija Koo became a solo artist. Her debut solo album Kun savukkeet on loppuneet was released in 1986. The next album Tuulten viemää, created with her then-husband Markku Impiö and released in 1993, was Kaija Koo's major breakthrough. It sold 175 000 copies, making it the sixth-best selling album of all times in Finland. Kaija Koo has also participated in the Finnish qualification of Eurovision Song Contest 1981 as a member of the background choir in Frederik's song "Titanic".

Since her breakthrough, Kaija Koo has remained successful, releasing a new album every few years. During her career, she has sold over 540,000 certified records, which makes her the 16th-best-selling music artist, the ninth-best-selling solo artist and the third-best-selling female solo artist in Finland.

Discography

Studio albums

Compilations

Singles

Listing
 "Steel City" (1980) (Steel City)
 "Seis"  (1980) (Steel City)
 "Kaupungin kasvot" (1981) (Steel City)
 "Radio Girls" (1982) (Steel City)
 "Muodikkaat kasvot" / "Pelihalli" (1983) (Kaija Kokkola & City Band)
 "Velho" / "Kolmen jälkeen aamulla" (1984)
 "Tyhjyys" / "Kuka huutaa" (1985)
 "Kaikki vanhat filmit" (1985)
 "Kun savukkeet on loppuneet" (1986)
 "Pelkään sua, pelkäät mua" (1986)
 "Kuka keksi rakkauden" (1993)
 "Niin kaunis on hiljaisuus" (1993)
 "Tule lähemmäs Beibi" (1993)
 "Kylmä ilman sua" (1994)
 "Menneen talven lumet" (1995)
 "Seuraavassa elämässä" (1995)
 "Taivas sisälläni" (1995)
 "Viisi vuodenaikaa" (1995)
 "Maailman tuulet vie" (1995)
 "Unihiekkamyrsky" (1997)
 "Minä muistan sinut" (1997)
 "Minun tuulessani soi" (1998)
 "Päivät lentää" (1998)
 "Siipiveikko" (1998)
 "Valomerkin aikaan" (1998)
 "Isä" (1999)
 "Ex-nainen" (2000)
 "Jos sua ei ois ollut" (2000)
 "Antaa olla" (2001)
 "Yhtä kaikki" (2002)
 "Et voi satuttaa enää" (2002)
 "Kylmät kyyneleet" (2004)
 "Aika jättää" (2004)
 "Alan jo unohtaa" (2004)
 "Huone kahdelle" (2005)
 "Jouluyö, juhlayö, toive joululaulu" (2005)
 "Minä olen muistanut" (2006)
 "Mentävä on" (2007)
 "Erottamattomat" (2007)
 "Miltä se tuntuu?" (2007)
 "Minä uskon" (2008)
 "Rakkaus on voimaa" (2010)
 "Ja mä laulan" (2011)
 "Vanhaa suolaa" (2011)
 "Päivä kerrallaan" (2012)
 "Supernaiset" (2014)
 "Surulapsi" (2014)
 "Ajoin koko yön" (2014)
 "En pelkää pimeää" (2015)
 "Joku jonka vuoksi kuolla" (2016)

See also
List of best-selling music artists in Finland

References

 kaijakoo.fi/biografia (Finnish)

External links
 Bonnier Amigo Music (Finnish)
 Kaija Koo Fanclub (Finnish)

1962 births
Living people
20th-century Finnish women singers
21st-century Finnish women singers
Singers from Helsinki